Federated content is digital media content that is designed to be self-managing to support reporting and rights management in a peer-to-peer (P2P) network.  Ex: Audio stored in a digital rights management (DRM) file format.

Digital rights management
Peer-to-peer computing